The Hockett Meadow Ranger Station was built in Sequoia National Park in 1934 by the Civilian Conservation Corps.  The National Park Service Rustic building is a three-room log cabin in the extreme southern end of the park, near Mineral King.

References

National Register of Historic Places in Sequoia National Park
National Park Service rustic in Sequoia National Park
Park buildings and structures on the National Register of Historic Places in California
Buildings and structures completed in 1934
History of the San Joaquin Valley
Civilian Conservation Corps in California
1934 establishments in California